Sándor Csjef (22 August 1950 – 20 March 2016) was a Hungarian amateur boxer. He won the gold medal in the welterweight division (– 67 kg) at the 1973 European Amateur Boxing Championships in Belgrade, Yugoslavia.

He died in a train accident near Monorierdő on 20 March 2016 at the age of 65.

References

1950 births
2016 deaths
Hungarian male boxers
Railway accident deaths in Hungary
Boxers from Budapest
Welterweight boxers
20th-century Hungarian people